Maroa is a city in Macon County, Illinois, United States. Its population was 1,577 at the 2020 census, down from 1,801 in 2010. It is included in the Decatur, Illinois Metropolitan Statistical Area.

History
The city was named after the Maroa people.

The first settler of the township was James Pettyjohn, who came from Kentucky and settled in 1839. The next group of settlers came from Ohio, Indiana, and Tennessee. The first schoolhouse was built in 1852. Maroa at one time was the second largest township, besides county seat Decatur, as it sat at the junction of both the Illinois Central Railroad and the Midland Railroad Company.

Maroa was officially incorporated as a town on March 7, 1867.

Geography
Maroa is located in northern Macon County at  (40.036951, -88.954967). Its northern boundary is the DeWitt County line. U.S. Route 51 passes through the west side of the city, leading south  to Decatur and north  to Clinton.

The headwaters of the North Fork, a west-flowing tributary of the Lake Fork and part of the Sangamon River watershed, pass through the northern part of the city.

Demographics

As of the census of 2000, there were 1,654 people, 651 households, and 477 families residing in the city. The racial makeup of the city was 99.27% White, 0.18% African American, 0.06% Native American, 0.06% Asian, 0.18% from other races, and 0.24% from two or more races. Hispanic or Latino people of any race were 0.91% of the population.

There were 651 households, out of which 35.0% had children under the age of 18 living with them, 60.5% were married couples living together, 9.7% had a female householder with no husband present, and 26.6% were non-families. 23.7% of all households were made up of individuals, and 11.8% had someone living alone who was 65 years of age or older. The average household size was 2.54 and the average family size was 3.00.

In the city, the population was spread out, with 27.4% under the age of 18, 7.6% from 18 to 24, 30.0% from 25 to 44, 22.1% from 45 to 64, and 12.9% who were 65 years of age or older. The median age was 37 years. For every 100 females, there were 100.5 males. For every 100 females age 18 and over, there were 93.1 males.

The median income for a household in the city was $41,615, and the median income for a family was $46,908. Males had a median income of $38,274 versus $20,809 for females. The per capita income for the city was $18,308. About 3.0% of families and 4.4% of the population were below the poverty line, including 3.9% of those under age 18 and 4.7% of those age 65 or over.

Notable people 

 Kevin Koslofski, Major League Baseball player for the Kansas City Royals
 Dean O'Banion, 1920s Irish-American mobster
 Jeff Query, football wide receiver with Green Bay Packers; played football at Millikin University

References

External links

Cities in Illinois
Cities in Macon County, Illinois